A Notification LED is a small RGB or monochrome LED light usually present on the front-facing screen bezel (display side) of smartphones and feature phones whose purpose is to blink or pulse to notify the phone user of missed calls, incoming SMS messages, notifications from other apps, low battery warning, etc., and optionally to facilitate locating the mobile phone in darkness. It usually pulses in a continuous way to draw the attention of the user. It is a part of the device's notification system that uses a cloud-powered push notification service to relay remote notification messages to the user, or local notifications. Similar to audio notifications, a notification LED is a very battery-efficient way to inform the user of new notifications without turning on the screen at all.

Overview 
In any mobile phone or smartphone, battery life is an important consideration and the display is the component that consumes the maximum battery when it is fully lit up. In regular usage, a user may only want to briefly turn on his or her phone to check if anything requires attention.

By blinking unobtrusively, the notification LED light discreetly conveys to the user of any potentially important message or call.  This way, the whole display does not have to be turned on every time a message arrives, thus saving the battery. When the user is away from the phone or when the phone is in silent mode, the blinking LED can effectively convey the user that some action is needed. Conversely, if the light does not blink, then it conveys to the user that there is no unread message or notification that requires his or her attention, again saving battery and the user's time and effort required to unlock the device, and check for new messages.

In some phones, the LED notification light is also sometimes designed to glow red when the battery is low,  when the battery is charging and turn green when the battery is fully charged. This saves the user the hassle of turning on the screen to check the battery percentage.

While most phones include the notification LED light on the front side, some smartphone manufacturers like LG or Nokia have also integrated it into the power button, while some phones from Motorola, Xiaomi, Razer or ASUS have their brand logo on the back side of the phone, serving as the notification light.

Customization based on app 
In some Android and BlackBerry smartphones, the notification LED light's behavior could be customized per app, so that, each color would indicate a different app. Apps like WhatsApp or Telegram also include a setting to set this color for the LED light.

Alternative always on display feature 

The notification LED light was popular when feature phones were widely used. In early smartphones running Windows Mobile or the Android operating system, the LED notification light was also a fairly common feature. These smartphones usually had LCD displays, so without the LED present, the entire backlight behind the display would need to be turned on to check for any new notifications.

Gradually, the smartphone industry has been moving towards OLED displays. With this transition, the dedicated notification LED light has slowly been eliminated from newer smartphones. There is also a focus by smartphone designers to minimize the screen bezels or keep them very thin, thus leaving no room for the notification LED light.

As a replacement for the LED light, some smartphones from Samsung, LG, Nokia include an Always On Display feature. On OLED displays, the Always-On Display (AOD) shows limited information while the phone is asleep, that is, when the entire display is not lit up. With OLED screens, only a part of the screen, or a few pixels on it can be turned on to convey information.

With any pixel on an OLED screen effectively being a notification LED, software can be used to customize its appearance. It can blink or pulse like a light continuously, or some phone manufacturers light up the display's pixels like a ring or have edge lighting.

References 

Mobile phones

Human–computer interaction
Information systems